David Arthur Brodie (July 28, 1867 – December 29, 1951) was an American agriculturalist and college football coach.  He served as the head football coach at Washington Agricultural College and School of Science—now known as Washington State University—for one season, in 1896, compiling a record of 2–0–1.

Brodie was born in Peterborough, Ontario and moved with family in 1883 to a farm near Silverton, Oregon.  He graduated from Oregon State Normal School—now known as Western Oregon University—in 1894.  He graduated Washington Agricultural in 1898 and became an assistant professor there.  Brodie later worked for the United States Department of Agriculture.  He moved  from Washington, D.C. to Avon Park, Florida around 1939 and died there on December 29, 1951.

Head coaching record

References

External links
 

1867 births
1951 deaths
American agriculturalists
19th-century players of American football
American football halfbacks
United States Department of Agriculture people
Washington State Cougars football coaches
Washington State Cougars football players
Western Oregon University alumni
Washington State University faculty
People from Marion County, Oregon
Sportspeople from Peterborough, Ontario
Coaches of American football from Oregon
Players of American football from Oregon